Sir James Arthur Ratcliffe  (born 18 October 1952) is a British billionaire, chemical engineer and businessman. Ratcliffe is the chairman and chief executive officer (CEO) of the INEOS chemicals group, which he founded in 1998 and of which he still owns two-thirds. The company is estimated to have had a turnover of $65 billion in 2021. He does not have a high public profile, and was once described by The Sunday Times as "publicity shy". In May 2018, Ratcliffe was the richest person in the UK, with a net worth of £21.05 billion. As of April 2020, Bloomberg Billionaires Index estimated his net worth at $28.2 billion, 55th richest  in the world and second in the UK. In September 2020, Ratcliffe officially changed his tax residence from Hampshire to Monaco, a move that it is estimated will save him £4 billion in tax.

Early life and education
Born in Failsworth, Greater Manchester, the son of a father who started out as a joiner, and a mother who was an accounts office worker. Ratcliffe was raised in a council house in the town until the age of 10, when the family moved to East Yorkshire. He was educated at Beverley Grammar School  His father eventually ran a factory making laboratory furniture.

Career
Ratcliffe's first job was with oil giant Esso, but he decided to broaden his skills into finance by studying management accounting, taking an MSc in finance at London Business School from 1978 to 1980 (he donated £25m to the school in 2016). In 1989, he joined US private equity group Advent International.

INEOS

Ratcliffe was a co-founder of Inspec, which leased the former BP Chemicals site in Antwerp, Belgium. In 1998, Ratcliffe formed INEOS in Hampshire to buy-out Inspec and the freehold of the Antwerp site.

From this small base, using high-yield debt to finance deals, Ratcliffe started buying unwanted operations from groups such as ICI and BP, selecting targets based on their potential to double their earnings over a five-year period. In 2006 INEOS bought BP's refining and petrochemical arm Innovene, giving INEOS refineries and plants in Scotland, Italy, Germany, France, Belgium, and Canada.

In April 2010, Ratcliffe moved INEOS's head office from Hampshire to Rolle, Switzerland, decreasing the amount of tax the company paid by £100m a year.

In 2015, Ratcliffe opened the UK headquarters of the chemicals and energy group in Knightsbridge, London, along with gas and oil trading, and other functions, saying he was "very cheerful about coming back to the UK". He was pleased with UK policy, London as a business base, and untroubled by the prospect of Brexit.  Full year 2015 EBITDA was €577 million compared to €253 million for 2014.

In the Sunday Times Rich List 2018, he was named as the richest man in the UK, with a net worth of £21.05 billion.

In February 2019, it was announced that INEOS would invest £1bn in the UK oil and chemical industries, to include an overhaul of the Forties pipeline system that is responsible for transporting a significant percentage of the UK's North Sea oil and gas.

On 1 May 2019, Ratcliffe criticised the current government rules that say fracking in Britain must be suspended every time a 0.5 magnitude tremor is detected, which has led to a de facto ban on fracking:

Sports ownership and sponsorship

On 13 November 2017, Ratcliffe became the owner of FC Lausanne-Sport, a Swiss Super League football club.

In 2018 Ratcliffe partnered with Ben Ainslie to form INEOS Team UK to compete for the 36th America's Cup in 2021 with Ratcliffe reportedly investing over £110 million in the project.

On 19 March 2019, Ratcliffe purchased the Team Sky cycling franchise, subsequently rebranded Team INEOS. Their first competitive race under the new INEOS sponsorship, was the 2019 Tour de Yorkshire. They subsequently won the 2019 Tour de France and 2021 Giro d'Italia with the Colombian rider Egan Bernal.

On 22 August 2019, the French competition authority permitted the €100 million takeover of Ligue 1 club OGC Nice from Chinese-American entrepreneur Chien Lee by INEOS.

Ratcliffe supported the October 2019 INEOS 1:59 Challenge, a successful effort by Eliud Kipchoge to run the classic marathon distance (42.195 kilometres or 26 miles 385 yards) under 2 hours.

In February 2020 INEOS became principal partners of Mercedes AMG F1, signing a five-year agreement with the team. In the same month, Ratcliffe rejected claims that he would buy a Premier League club, having previously been linked to Chelsea. However, he reversed direction in April 2022, making a bid of £4.25 billion for the club after Roman Abramovich put it up for sale.

In July 2021 Greenpeace criticized a decision by New Zealand Rugby to accept six years of sponsorship from INEOS as being inconsistent with the country's "clean green" values.

Following the 2022 Russian invasion of Ukraine, sanctions on Roman Abramovich, long-term owner of Premier League side Chelsea F.C., forced him to put the club up for sale. Ratcliffe made £4.25 billion bid to buy the club but this was rejected. Despite the rejection, Ratcliffe remained hopeful of a takeover. Chelsea FC were eventually sold to US businessman Todd Boehly.

In August 2022 Ratcliffe expressed interest in buying the Premier League football team Manchester United. In October 2022 he was rumoured to invest in West Ham United. In January 2023 INEOS announced publicly that it had entered into the formal process of bidding for Manchester United after the current owners announced it was looking for new investors.

Energy transition 
In October 2021, Ratcliffe announced plans to invest more than €2bn (£1.7bn) into electrolysis projects to make zero-carbon green hydrogen across Europe. He said the first units will produce clean hydrogen through the electrolysis of water in Norway, powered by renewable electricity, and will serve as a hub to provide gas for the country’s transport industry. This will be followed by projects in Germany and Belgium. Ratcliffe also intends to invest in France and the UK, where his hydrogen business will be headquartered.

Environmental pollution 
In March 2019, INEOS said it would close its Middlesbrough manufacturing plant unless it is allowed to 'defer compliance' with EU rules designed to prevent air and water pollution. An analysis of data from the Environment Agency (EA) also reveals the plant clocked up 176 permit violations between 2014 and 2017. An EA spokesperson said: "air emissions are well over legal limits and this poses a risk to the environment". INEOS director Tom Crotty said the firm "cannot justify" the investment required to comply with EU air and water pollution rules due to come into force in the coming years.

INEOS has carried out small projects in bio ethanol production using Clostridium bacteria, but it has had problems because the syngas has levels of hydrogen cyanide too high for the bacteria to survive. INEOS sold the Florida plant to Alliance Bio-Products Inc. in 2017.

Honours and awards
In May 2009, Ratcliffe was granted an honorary fellowship by the Institution of Chemical Engineers citing "his sustained leadership in building the INEOS Group." In 2013 he received the Petrochemical Heritage Award. Ratcliffe was appointed Knight Bachelor in the 2018 Birthday Honours for services to business and to investment.

Personal life
Ratcliffe has two sons with previous wife Amanda Townson. He has one daughter from a previous relationship, with Maria Alessia Maresca, an Italian tax lawyer.

Ratcliffe lives in Monaco and Hampshire, England. In May 2017, he submitted his fifth plan, less ambitious than the first four, to build a "luxury home" at Thorns Beach, near Beaulieu, on the Hampshire coast, which would replace an existing two-bedroom bungalow. In September 2020, Ratcliffe officially changed his tax residence from Hampshire to Monaco, a move that it is estimated will save him £4 billion in tax. He owns an estate on the shores of Lake Geneva in Switzerland and the hotels, Le Portetta (Courchevel, France) and Lime Wood (Hampshire, England).

Ratcliffe enjoys physical adventure and has made expeditions to the North and South Poles, as well as a three-month-long motorbike trek in South Africa. In 2013, he completed the Marathon Des Sables across the Sahara Desert, and he has founded a charity "Go Run for Fun", encouraging thousands of children aged between five and ten to get active by creating celebrity-driven events. Another charity, the Jim Ratcliffe Foundation, helped build a new ski clubhouse in Courchevel to help underprivileged children learn to ski. The Charity Commission for England and Wales has opened a “regulatory compliance case” to investigate “concerns about the governance and management of the Jim Ratcliffe Foundation”.

Ratcliffe is a Eurosceptic, once said; "As a business, INEOS supported the common market, but not a United States of Europe." He is opposed to the "layers and layers" of European legislation that he feels is making European economies increasingly cumbersome and inefficient. He has publicly expressed his disdain for politicians, criticising them for the way they negotiated the Brexit withdrawal agreement and are often happy to "lunch around with bankers", but less keen to discuss economic issues with industrialists and business owners.

Ratcliffe has owned two super yachts, Hampshire and Hampshire II. His first yacht was built as Barbara Jean by Feadship. In 2012, he took delivery of the  Feadship Hampshire II, built by Royal Van Lent, which he still owns.

Ratcliffe is not only a supporter of Manchester United, but formerly a Chelsea season ticket holder. In August 2022, he expressed an interest in buying United. In January 2023 his firm INEOS entered into negotiations for the purchase of Manchester United.

References

External links

 Business big shot: Jim Ratcliffe, 2008 biography from The Times
 Jim Ratcliffe of INEOS: Uncanny ability to spot undervalued assets, 2006 biography from ''The Financial Times'(pay-to-view)'
 Dearbail Jordan (13 May 2018), "Jim Ratcliffe: Turning cast-offs into gold", BBC News

1952 births
Alumni of London Business School
Alumni of the University of Birmingham
Living people
Ineos
People from Failsworth
English billionaires
English chief executives
People educated at Beverley Grammar School
Knights Bachelor
Businesspeople awarded knighthoods
English football chairmen and investors
English expatriates in Monaco
Fellows of the Institution of Chemical Engineers